Pippy may refer to:

 John Pippy (born 1970), American politician
 Jesse Pippy, American politician
 Katelyn Pippy, an American actress
 Pippy (character), a character in the film Bubble Boy
 Pippy (manga character), a character in Osamu Tezuka's Star System
 Pippy Park, urban park
 Pippy Poopypants, a villain in the book series Captain Underpants

See also

 Pippi (disambiguation)
 Pipi (disambiguation)